Jonathan Elsom (born 22 September 1938) is a New Zealand-born television actor, writer, sculptor and artist. He appeared in many British and Australian television series and films, which include The Troubleshooters, The Avengers, The Saint, The Adventures of Don Quick, Z-Cars, Crown Court, Worzel Gummidge Down Under, The Feds, Review with Myles Barlow and others.

Acting credits

References

External links

Jonathan Elsom's official site

1938 births
Living people
New Zealand emigrants to England
New Zealand expatriates in England
English male television actors
Australian male actors
Australian expatriates in England